Carabus nemoralis (commonly called the "bronze carabid") is a ground beetle common in central and northern Europe, as well as Iceland and Canada. While native to Europe, it has been introduced to and is expanding its range throughout North America.

Ecology

Feeding habits
Carabus nemoralis is a beneficial predator as it eats the agricultural pest Deroceras reticulatum slug in its young stage and also its eggs. Use of Carabus nemoralis as a biocontrol agent for multiple pests in large scale farming operations have been tested in recent years.

Defensive adaptations
It is known that some Carabus nemoralis populations will regurgitate foul-smelling brownish-red liquid as a defense mechanism.

Reproduction

Carabus nemoralis typically has one breeding period in the spring with eggs hatching in autumn of the same year. )

References

External links
 Scanned 3d model
 Picture gallery

nemoralis
Beetles of Europe
Beetles described in 1764
Taxa named by Otto Friedrich Müller